The 1000 metres distance for women in the 2010–11 ISU Speed Skating World Cup was contested over eight races on six occasions, out of a total of eight World Cup occasions for the season, with the first occasion taking place in Heerenveen, Netherlands, on 12–14 November 2010, and the final occasion also taking place in Heerenveen on 4–6 March 2011.

Heather Richardson of the United States won the cup, while defending champion Christine Nesbitt of Canada came second, and Margot Boer of the Netherlands came third.

Top three

Race medallists

Standings
''Standings as of 6 March 2011 (end of the season).

References

Women 1000
ISU